is a national university in Japan. It is located in Naruto, Tokushima. The current president is Kazuo Yamashita. The school employs around 160 professors.

External links 
 Naruto University of Education

Universities and colleges in Tokushima Prefecture
Japanese national universities
Educational institutions established in 1981
1981 establishments in Japan
Naruto, Tokushima
Teachers colleges in Japan